WFSK-FM (88.1 MHz) is a non-profit radio station in Nashville, Tennessee.  Owned and operated by Fisk University, it broadcasts a smooth jazz format under the branding "Jazzy 88," although the station also features various specialty programs, both music and spoken-word, aimed at both the Fisk student body and the Nashville area's general African-American population.  The station's studios are located inside Dubois Hall and its transmitter are located nearby -- both on campus.

Unlike some other stations operated by historically black colleges and universities (HBCUs) in the present, WFSK has no affiliation with the public radio system (e.g., NPR) and operates independently.

Sharon Kay is the general manager of WFSK; Xuam Lawson is the program director.

History
The station began from a Fisk student initiative in 1969 to supplement commercial stations that served black listeners in Nashville. Its original callsign was WRFN-FM (now used by an unrelated community-licensed station in Nashville), and started operations sometime in 1973, indicated by University and station records. According to the Federal Communications Commission, the station was first issued a license on January 15, 1974, some months after what were probably test broadcasts were first conducted. Its current license dates to May 26, 1983, when the present WFSK callsign was adopted.

See also
List of Nashville media

References

External links
Official site

FSK
FSK
Smooth jazz radio stations in the United States
Radio stations established in 1973
1973 establishments in Tennessee